Lak is a Kurdish tribe native to southwestern Iran. They speak Laki, which is considered a Kurdish dialect by most linguists. However, the Laks firmly identify with the Lurs, and this is especially pronounced amongst the Laks of Iran's Lorestan Province.

Laks inhabit a large part of Lorestan Province where they constitute over 65% of the population and most of the eastern regions of the neighboring province of Kermanshah, and some parts of western Ilam province (Poshte-Kuhi Laks). The area to the east of Mount Kabir is known as Pishe-Kuh, and west of the mountain is known as Poshte-Kuh.

Origins
Vladimir Minorsky, who wrote the entry "Lak" in the first edition of the Encyclopaedia of Islam, referred to the Lak as "the most southern group of Kurd tribes in Persia" and stated that their language has the characteristics of Kurdish. Some of the Lak tribes living in Lorestān Province live among Lur tribes, and have assimilated over time toward a Lur identity. Although, Minorsky quotes some evidence indicating that they were brought there from further north. He mentions that they are often confused with the Lurs, whom they resemble from an ethnic and somatic point of view, but are different.

History
The Zand dynasty who ruled parts of southwestern Iran was of Laki origin (from the Zand tribe). According to the third edition of the Encyclopedia of Islam, the Zands "were a branch of the Laks, a subgroup of the northern Lurs, who spoke Luri, a Western Iranian language". Similarly, according to the second edition of the Encyclopaedia of Islam, the Zands "belonged to the Lakk group of Lurs". According to The Oxford Encyclopedia of the Islamic World, likewise, the Zand tribe "spoke the Lakk dialect of the Lur language".

Self-identification
The Laks firmly identify with the Lurs, "which appears to have been strengthening in recent times". This self-identification is particularly pronounced amongst the Laks of Lorestan Province, where most Laki-speakers of Iran live. Social catalysts behind this identification stem from the fact that the Lurs were historically prominent as governors of both Lorestan and Ilam, as well as due to the main corpus of the Laks in Lorestan Province having minority status.

Sub-tribes
List of Lak sub-tribes:

 Adinevand
 Ahmedvand
 Amraei
 Azadbakht
 Baharvand
 Balvand
 Beiranvand
 Bijanvand
 Chahardoli
 Dalvand
 Dinarvand
 Geravand
 Ghiasvand
 Hassanvand
 Itivand
 Jalalvand
 Jalilvand
 Kakavand
 Kamalvand
 Khalvand
 Kolivand
 Koushki
 Kushvand
 Mafivand
 Mirvand
 Mumiavand
 Musavand
 Nurali
 Osmanvand
 Padarvand
 Payeravand
 Rizavand
 Romanvand
 Sagvand
 Shahivand
 Şêxbizin
 Tarkhan
 Torkashvand
 Yousefvand
 Zand tribe
 Zola

Notable Lak people
 Karim Khan Zand
Alireza Beiranvand

Notes

Kurdish tribes
Ilam Province
Lorestan Province
Lak (tribe)